Thieves' cant (also known as thieves' argot, rogues' cant, or peddler's French) is a cant, cryptolect, or argot which was formerly used by thieves, beggars, and hustlers of various kinds in Great Britain and to a lesser extent in other English-speaking countries. It is now mostly obsolete and used in literature and fantasy role-playing, although individual terms continue to be used in the criminal subcultures of Britain and the United States.

History
It was claimed by Samuel Rid that thieves' cant was devised around 1530 "to the end that their cozenings, knaveries and villainies might not so easily be perceived and known", by Cock Lorel and the King of the Gypsies at The Devil's Arse, a cave in Derbyshire. It seems to have originated in this period, but the story is almost certainly a myth.

Cant is a common feature of rogue literature of the Elizabethan period in England, in both pamphlets and Elizabethan theatre. Thomas Harman, a justice of the peace, included examples in his Caveat for Common Cursitors (1566). He collected his information from vagabonds he interrogated at his home in Essex. He also called it "pedlars' French" or "pelting speech", and was told that it had been invented as a secret language some 30 years earlier. The earliest records of canting words are included in The Highway to the Spitalfields by Robert Copland . Copland and Harman were used as sources by later writers. A spate of rogue literature started in 1591 with Robert Greene's series of five pamphlets on cozenage and coney-catching. These were continued by other writers, including Thomas Middleton, in The Black Book and Thomas Dekker, in The Bellman of London (1608), Lantern and Candlelight (1608), and O per se O (1612). Cant was included together with descriptions of the social structure of beggars, the techniques of thieves including coney-catching, gull-groping, and gaming tricks, and the descriptions of low-lifes of the kind which have always been popular in literature.

Harman included a canting dictionary which was copied by Thomas Dekker and other writers. That such words were known to a wide audience is evidenced by the use of cant words in Jacobean theatre. Middleton and Dekker included it in The Roaring Girl, or Moll Cut-Purse (1611). It was used extensively in The Beggars' Bush, a play by Francis Beaumont, John Fletcher and Philip Massinger, first performed in 1622, but possibly written c. 1614. The play remained popular for two centuries, and the canting section was extracted as The Beggars Commonwealth by Francis Kirkman as one of the drolls he published for performance at markets, fairs and camps.

The influence of this work can be seen from the independent life taken on by the "Beggar King Clause", who appears as a real character in later literature. The ceremony for anointing the new king was taken from Thomas Harman and described as being used by Romani people in the nineteenth century. Bampfylde Moore Carew, who published his picaresque Life in 1745, claimed to have been chosen to succeed "Clause Patch" as King of the Beggars, and many editions of his work included a canting dictionary. Such dictionaries, often based on Harman's, remained popular, including The Canting Academy, or Devils Cabinet opened, by Richard Head (1673), and BE's Dictionary of the Canting Crew (1699).

Sources
It was commonly believed that cant developed from Romany. Etymological research now suggests a substantial correlation between Romany words and cant, and equivalents, in many European languages. However, in England, Scotland, and Wales this does not apply. The Egyptians, as they were known, were a separate group from the standard vagabonds, and cant was fully developed within 50 years of their first arrival in England. Comparison of Romany words in the Winchester Confessions taken in 1616 with modern Welsh Romany show high commonality. This record also distinguished between Romany and Cant words and again the attributions of the words to the different categories is consistent with later records.

There is doubt as to the extent to which the words in canting literature were taken from street usage, or were adopted by those wishing to show that they were part of a real or imagined criminal underworld. The transmission has almost certainly been in both directions. The Winchester Confessions indicate that Roma engaged in criminal activities, or those associated with them and with a good knowledge of their language, were using cant, but as a separate vocabulary - Angloromani was used for day to day matters, while cant was used for criminal activities. A thief in 1839 claimed that the cant he had seen in print was nothing like the cant then used by Roma, thieves and beggars. He also said that each of these used distinct vocabularies, which overlapped; the Roma having a cant word for everything, and the beggars using a lower style than the thieves.

Examples
ken – house
bob ken - a house that can easily be robbed
boozing ken – alehouse
stauling ken - a house that will receive stolen goods
lag – water; as a verb, penal transportation
bene – good
patrico – priest
autem – church
darkmans – night
 – fire
mort – woman
cove – man
cully - a victim
bung - a purse
fence - a person who buys stolen goods
fencing cully - a person who will receive stolen goods
fambles - hands; also goods that are probably stolen
bite - to cheat or cozen
prog - meat
scowre - to run away
cuttle-bung - a knife with a curved blade
foin - a pickpocketing technique in which conversation and deception are used to steal a purse from a victim; also someone who uses this technique
nip - pickpocketing by slashing and palming a purse; also a person who uses this technique
knuckle - a young pickpocket
stall - a person who identifies and manoeuvres a victim so that their purse can be stolen
bulk the cull to the right! - an instruction by a pickpocket to a stall to distract a cully by striking them on their right breast, so that their purse may be stolen

Equivalent of thieves' cant in other languages
 Bargoens, Netherlands
 Fenya, Russia
 Germanía, Spain
 Grypsera, Poland
 Rotwelsch, Germany
 Coa, Chile

See also
A New Dictionary of the Terms Ancient and Modern of the Canting Crew

References

Bibliography
Judges, A.V., (1930, reprinted 1974) The Elizabethan Underworld, includes the main works of rogue literature
Aydelotte, F., (1913, reprinted 1967) Elizabethan Rogues and Vagabonds, provided analysis of the literature.
Coleman, J., (2004) A History of Cant and Slang Dictionaries, Volume 1: 1567-1784
Green, J., Romany Rise, Critical Quarterly, Volume 41 Page 118 - October 1999 (commenting on Becker-Ho, A., Les Princes du Jargon (1990 & 1993)
Harman, T. (1814) A caveat or warning for common cursetors, vulgarly called vagabonds.
Dictionary of the Vulgar Tongue. A Dictionary of Buckish Slang, University Wit and Pickpocket Eloquence. 1811 edition of a dictionary compiled by Captain Grose in 1785.
Transcription of canting terms from 1736 and published then by Nathan Bailey
The Lexicon of Thieves Cant

Further reading
 George W. Matsell (1859), Vocabulum, or, The rogue's lexicon: compiled from the most authentic sources, a dictionary of American thieves' cant.

External links

 18th and 19th Century Thieves' Cant

Cant languages
English-based argots